Charles I of England was the second King of the then newly enthroned House of Stuart and had many descendants. He was the second but eldest surviving son of King James I of England. He became heir apparent to the English, Irish and Scottish thrones on the death of his elder brother in 1612. Later, he married a Bourbon princess, Henrietta Maria of France, after a failed Spanish match.

During his time in Spain, he met a daughter from one of the junior branches of the Brydges family (Barons Chandos) of Sudeley Castle, by whom he had a natural daughter, Joanna Brydges, who was brought up in Mandinam, Wales. She went on to marry Bishop Jeremy Taylor, as his second wife. From this marriage, two daughters were born, Mary Taylor, who married Bishop Francis Marsh and had issue; and Joanna Taylor, who married Irish M.P Harrison and had issue.

His reign is known for his conflicts with the Parliament of England, which sought to curb his royal prerogative. Charles believed in the divine right of kings, which was against the belief of many of his subjects, leading to them perceiving his actions as those of a tyrannical absolute monarch. His religious policies, coupled with his marriage to a Roman Catholic, made him an enemy of the Puritans and Calvinists. Most of his actions as monarch ultimately helped precipitate his own downfall, and his eventual deposition and beheading in 1649 and the declaration of the Protectorate under Oliver Cromwell.

Many of today's European royalty are descendants of Charles, such as Juan Carlos I of Spain, Franz, Duke of Bavaria, Philippe of Belgium, Henri, Grand Duke of Luxembourg and the late Otto von Habsburg. Many are related to him via collateral lines, such as Charles III of the United Kingdom (descended from his sister Elizabeth Stuart, Queen of Bohemia, mother of Sophia, Electress of Hanover); Willem-Alexander of the Netherlands and Margrethe II of Denmark. He is also the ancestor of Diana, Princess of Wales, mother of William, Prince of Wales and Prince Harry, Duke of Sussex who are first and fifth in line to the succession to the British throne after their father. This article deals with the numerous individuals who are and were descendants of Charles by his wife Henrietta Maria of France. He is not known to have had any illegitimate children after his marriage.

Marriage and Progeny

Descendants

Illegitimate progeny of Charles II of England

Progeny of Princess Mary

Progeny of James II of England

Illegitimate progeny of James II of England

Progeny of Henrietta of England

Grandchildren and later descendants of Henrietta of England

See also 

House of Stuart
Henrietta Maria of France
Descendants of James II of England
Descendants of Philippe I, Duke of Orléans

References

House of Stuart
Descendants of individuals